Gontran Cherrier is a French baker and pastry chef, a cookbook author, a TV presenter and an entrepreneur born on 11 November 1978 in Luc-sur-Mer (Calvados), France.

Biography

Childhood 
Born in Normandy on 11 November 1978, Cherrier a fourth-generation baker grew up in the small city of Luc-sur-Mer. At 8 years old his parents moved to Paris and opened their first bakery where he earned his first stripes. At 16 he went to the prestigious Ferrandi culinary school and then to les Grands Moulin de Paris where the young chef has passed one by one the diplomas to become master baker.

Career 
In 1999 he integrated the prestigious 3 Michelins stars restaurant "l’Arpège" and worked beside Alain Passard.

Cherrier is successively a pastry chef, a chocolate maker and a baker.

He was involved in training programmes in Russia, setting up production centres in Romania, his travels have broadened his horizons giving him more and more skills and widening his already furnished palette.

Medias 
Back in France, Gontran continues to teach and in 2005 he wrote his first cookbook named "a croquer". Eight other books will follow in eight years: "Ultra chocolat", "Gontran joue de la casserole", "Les bons plats de Gontran", "Gontran fait son pain", "pains" "Pains, Toastés", "Cuisinez givré" & "Mini Cakes, tartes pies & Co".  Followed by several editorial collaboration.

Cherrier presents his own TV shows: "Canaille+" "les Tartines de Gontran", followed by "Gontran cuisine". In 2011 he joined the team of de William LEYMERGIE at Télématin on France2.

In 2013 he was a member of the jury of "la meilleure boulangerie de France" (the best bakery in France), broadcast daily during one hour on M6 and gathering an average audience of 1 million viewers where he worked with Bruno Cormerais for the first three seasons of the show.

Gontran Cherrier shops 
In 2010, Cherrier opened his first bakery in Montmartre in Paris followed by a second one in the 17th arrondissement of Paris, and a third in Saint-Germain-En-Laye en 2013.

In 2012, his first bakery abroad opened in Singapore under the name of Tiong Bahru Bakery by Gontran Cherrier quickly followed by Japan (Tokyo, Fukuoka, Nagoya...) and South Korea (Seoul, Busan...).

In 2016 the brand is expanding to Australia with the first opening in June in Melbourne on 140 Smith Street, Collingwood. quickly followed by Taiwan in July in Taipei City on 302, Section 4, Zhongxiao E Rd, Da’an District.
As of July 2016, Gontran Cherrier Boulanger accounts for 29 bakeries.

References

French chefs